Varicopeza is a genus of sea snails, marine gastropod mollusks in the family Cerithiidae.

Species
Species within the genus Varicopeza include:

 Varicopeza crystallina (Dall, 1881)
 Varicopeza pauxilla (A. Adams, 1855)

References

Cerithiidae